Edward Woods (July 5, 1903 – October 8, 1989) was an American actor. He is probably best known for his extensive role as Matt Doyle in The Public Enemy opposite James Cagney.

Life and career

Woods' parents were Mary Clark and William B. Woods, and he had two brothers, Roy C. and William B. Woods. After graduating from the University of Southern California, Woods became an actor. He appeared at the old Salt Lake Theatre in The Copperhead, as Lionel Barrymore's teenage son. In New York City, he appeared in many successful Broadway productions then began a movie career. He worked with Cary Grant, Greta Garbo, Jean Harlow, John Barrymore, and Clark Gable.

He played Matt Doyle opposite James Cagney's Tom Powers in The Public Enemy (1931). 

Woods' acting credits on Broadway included Tortilla Flat (1938), One Good Year (1935), Houseparty (1929), Zeppelin (1929), Trapped (1928), and Speak Easy (1927). He was the producer of Buttrio Square (1952) on Broadway.

After his film acting career ended, Woods went into producing, directing, and theatrical management, working with the Schubert Organization and 20th Century Fox.

In 1947, Woods married Margery Ramsey "Gabrielle" Morris. In 1959, they adopted a daughter, Robin. Woods retired in 1975, and moved to Salt Lake City, Utah. He died in 1989.

Filmography

Broadway Appearances
 Tortilla Flat, Jan 12, 1938 - Jan 1938
 One Good Year, Nov 27, 1935 - Jun 1936
 Houseparty, Sep 9, 1929 - Feb 1930
 Zeppelin, Jan 14, 1929 - Mar 1929
 Trapped, Sep 11, 1928 - Sep 1928
 Speak Easy, Sep 26, 1927 - Nov 1927

References

External links

1903 births
1989 deaths
American male film actors
American male stage actors
Male actors from Michigan
Burials at Salt Lake City Cemetery
People from Menominee, Michigan
20th-century American male actors
Broadway theatre producers